According to the Book of Mormon, the Jaredites are a people who lived in ancient America shortly after the confounding of the languages at the Tower of Babel and are written of principally in the Book of Ether.  The Lineage of the Ether is written in The Book of Ether, chapter 1 verses 6-33.  Most individuals are only briefly mentioned in the narrative of the Book of Ether.  Each is notable in that he is a descendant of Jared, an ancestor to Ether, and most were also Kings of the Jaredites.

Family tree

Notes
 The Jaredites desired to have a king from Jared and his brother's sons, and would have liked Pagag, the eldest son of the brother of Jared to be king. But he would not and the people were ready to make him regardless of his wishes, but Jared commanded that they not constrain any to be their king.  They went through all his brothers’ sons and finally came to the last son of the four of Jared, Orihah. He took the throne, making him the first king of the Jaredites. Under him the people prospered and he was purported to be righteous execute justice even after Jared and his brother died, for the rest of his life.  His had thirty-one children, among which were twenty-three sons. After the death of Orihah his son Kib, born to him in his old age, reigned in his stead.  It is through his line that Ether, the last prophet of the Jaredites, was descended, thus indicating his royal lineage.

 Orihah had three brothers, Gilgah, Mahah, and Jacom.

 Kib  was the son of Orihah.

 Corihor and Shule were the sons of Kib.

Cohor  and Noah were sons of Corihor.  Together they joined with "all his brethren and many of the people" to establish a rival kingdom to Shule’s. There are no further references of Cohor and Noah, but Cohor seems to have been influential, for Noah later names a son Cohor and the name Cohor is passed down to the end of the Jaredite lineage.

 Coriantum was the son of Emer, grandson of Omer, and great grandson of Shule.

 Com was the son of Coriantum.

 Heth was the son of Com, the king of the Jaredite nation, and dethroned his father to take the throne himself by turning to "secret plans" (Secret combinations).

 Shez was the son of Heth.

 Riplakish was the son of Shez.

 Morianton was a descendant of Riplakish.

 Kim   was the son of Morianton.

 Levi was the son of Kim.

 Corom was the son of Levi.

 Kish was the son of Corom.

 Lib was the son of Kish.

 Hearthom  reigned for 24 years before his kingdom "was taken away from him", and he lived the rest of his life in captivity.  One of his later descendants, Com, was able to regain the kingdom of part of his people.

 Heth was the heir to the throne, however, his father was the Jaredite king Hearthom, who begat him while in captivity and Heth lived his entire life in captivity.  One of his later descendants, Com, was able to regain the throne of part of his people.

 Aaron is mentioned in a single verse in the Book of Ether.

 Amnigaddah was heir to the throne of the Jaredites, like his great-grandfather (Hearthom), grandfather (Heth), and father (Aaron), Amnigaddah lived his entire life in "captivity".

 Coriantum was the son of Amnigaddah.

 Com was the son of Coriantum.

 Shiblom (also Shiblon) was the son of Com.

 Seth was the son of Shiblon.

 Ahah obtained the kingdom even though his father Seth died in captivity.  Ahah is only briefly mentioned in the narrative of the Book of Ether, wherein it is noted that "he did do all manner of iniquity in his days, by which he did cause the shedding of much blood; and few were his days."

 Ethem  was the son of Ahah and a Jaredite king, is not to be confused with its writer, Ether, who is one of his descendants. Moron was his son.

 Moron was the son of Ethem.

 Coriantor  was the son of Moron.

 Ether is one of the last surviving Jaredites, and primary author of the Book of Ether. Ether's grandfather Moron, had been king of the Jaredites. Moron was overthrown and "dwelt in captivity all the remainder of his days". Ether's father, Coriantor, was born while his father was captive and Coriantor "dwelt in captivity all his days". Ether "was a prophet of the Lord" and "lived in the days of Coriantumr; and Coriantumr was king over all the land".

Reign of Omer

Omer   was a Jaredite king whose reign was troubled by rebellion and secret combinations.

 Omer was the son of Shule who was king of the people of Jared. 

 Omer had a son whom he named Jared. He is presented as one of the most evil kings among his people.  Jared rebelled against his father Omer and moved to a land called Heth. After some time, he was able to convince half of the people of the kingdom to support him and he overthrew his father.  Omer was kept captive, during which time "he begat sons and daughters", among whom were Esrom and Coriantumr.  Esrom and Coriantumr raised an army with which they defeated Jared's army.  They were about to slay Jared when he convinced them to spare his life.

However, Jared still desired to be king, so his daughter devised a plan for him to regain the throne which they carried out.  Jared's daughter danced for a man called Akish who then desired to marry her.  Jared agreed, on the condition that Akish "will bring unto me the head of my father, the king."  Akish gathered Jared's kinsmen, had them swear an oath to follow him and agree that anyone revealing the plan would be killed.  Akish and those loyal to him took the kingdom from Omer.  However, Omer and his children (who hadn't plotted against him) fled past the hill Shem to a place called Ablom along the seashore.  Jared became the king, but Akish plotted against him too and had Jared killed.

  After assuming the throne, Akish had one of his sons shut up in prison without food until he died.  Nimrah, brother of the man starved to death, was angry at his father because of this.  Nimrah gathered together some others, left the kingdom and moved to where Omer was living.  Akish's sons desired power, so they paid most of the people to join their faction.  This faction and those loyal to Akish fought "for many years" until there were only thirty people left.

 Omer was then restored to the throne (again), he anointed his son Emer to be the king, and lived two more years.  Emer's rule was a time of much righteousness and prosperity in the land. Emer was so righteous, he saw Jesus Christ.   He was succeeded as king by his son Coriantum to whom he abdicated the throne four years before his death. 

References 

Book of Mormon people